The Swedish Federation for Voluntary Defence Education and Training (commonly known as Försvarsutbildarna) is a nationwide voluntary defence organization with the aim of strengthening the Swedish Total Defence. The organization was founded in 1943 under the name of the Swedish Central Federation for Voluntary Military Training (CFB) before changing to its current name in 2006.

History
On 5 July 1912, 18 of Sweden's Landstorm associations met at a congress and made a decision to form Sveriges Landstormsföreningars riksförbund ("National Association of the Swedish Landstorm Association's"). In 1915, Landstormspojkar was formed, which became the first youth department. The aim of the youth departments' activities was, in collaboration with home, school and employers, to raise Swedish boys and young people to be good citizens with the ability to participate in the defence of the motherland and to assist in the schools' military service training.

Through the Defence Act of 1942, the Landstorms organization was abolished. However, there was still a need for voluntary officer training to complement the compulsory training that was now introduced. On 1 June 1943, the King in Council determined basic statutes for the Swedish Central Federation for Voluntary Military Training (CFB), whose main task was to conduct voluntary officer training.

In January 2006, the organization changed its name to the Swedish Federation for Voluntary Defence Education and Training (Svenska Försvarsutbildningsförbundet, FBU) to mark that the organization should keep pace with the changes that have taken place in Sweden's defence and security policy and the development of the Swedish Armed Forces. The organization now turned to everyone who was interested in supporting society's civilian crisis management. At the 2012 national assembly, a new business idea was adopted with a new focus. The activities of the organization now included the entire scale from the security of the individual to the defence of society.

Nationwide associations
The organization are found all over Sweden through their regional associations and local associations as well as through their nationwide associations that gather around different skills or activities:

Association of Interpreter Officers (Befälsföreningen Militärtolkar)
CBRN Association (CBRN-förbundet)
Parachute Rangers Association (Förbundet Fallskärmsjägarna)
Fältartisterna
Military Chaplain Association (Förbundet Militära Själavårdare)
Försvarsutbildarna Miljö och hälsa
Association of Home Guard Officers (Hemvärnsbefälets Riksförbund)
Cavalry and Ranger Association (Kavalleri- och Jägarförbundet)
Crisis Communicators (Kriskommunikatörerna, Criscom)
Coastal Ranger Association (Förbundet Kustjägarna)
Air Defence Association (Luftvärnsförbundet)
Military Police Association (Militärpolisförbundet)
PsyOp Association (Psyopsförbundet)
Association of Swedish Reserve Officers (Förbundet Sveriges Reservofficerare, SVEROF)
Swedish Medical Association (Svenska Sjukvårdsförbundet)

Regional associations

Region South
 Försvarsutbildarna Blekinge
 Försvarsutbildarna Kalmar
 Försvarsutbildarna Kronoberg
 Försvarsutbildarna Northern Småland
 Försvarsutbildarna Skåne
 Försvarsutbildarna Östergötland

Region North
 Försvarsutbildarna Jämtland
 Försvarsutbildarna Norrbotten
 Försvarsutbildarna Västerbotten
 Försvarsutbildarna Västernorrland

Region Center
 Försvarsutbildarna Dalarna
 Försvarsutbildarna Gotland
 Försvarsutbildarna Gävleborg
 Försvarsutbildarna Stockholm and Södermanland
 Försvarsutbildarna Uppland
 Försvarsutbildarna Västmanland

Region West
 Försvarsutbildarna Bohuslän-Dal
 Försvarsutbildarna Gothenburg
 Försvarsutbildarna Halland
 Försvarsutbildarna Skaraborg
 Försvarsutbildarna Värmland
 Försvarsutbildarna Älvsborg 
 Försvarsutbildarna Örebro

Secretaries General
1924−1944: Lieutenant colonel 
1944−1961: Colonel 
1961−1970: Colonel Carl Yngve Dahl
1970−1990: Colonel Björn Orward
1990−2002: Colonel Anders Håkansson 
2002−2011: Leif Tyrén
2011–2021: Colonel 
2022–present: Colonel Bo Stennabb

See also
Swedish Federation for Voluntary Defence Education and Training Merit Badge
Swedish Federation for Voluntary Defence Education and Training Medal of Merit

References

Further reading

External links

 

Volunteer organizations in Sweden
Organizations established in 1943
1943 establishments in Sweden